Percival Arthur Ellis (10 May 1906 – 25 April 1992) was an Australian rules footballer who played with Fitzroy in the Victorian Football League (VFL) and a cricketer who played three first-class cricket matches for Victoria in 1931.

See also
 List of Victoria first-class cricketers

References

External links 		

Percy Ellis's playing statistics from The VFA Project

1906 births
1992 deaths
Australian rules footballers from Melbourne
Australian Rules footballers: place kick exponents
Fitzroy Football Club players
Preston Football Club (VFA) players
Victoria cricketers
People from Abbotsford, Victoria